Antrona Schieranco is a comune (municipality) in the Province of Verbano-Cusio-Ossola in the Italian region Piedmont, located about  northeast of Turin and about  northwest of Verbania, in a branch of the Val d'Ossola, on the border with Switzerland.

Antrona Schieranco borders the following municipalities: Bognanco, Borgomezzavalle, Calasca-Castiglione, Ceppo Morelli, Montescheno, Saas Almagell (Switzerland), Vanzone con San Carlo, Zwischbergen (Switzerland). Until 1946, it was a center for silver and gold mining.

The Portjengrat (Italian: Pizzo d'Andolla) is located nearby.

References

Cities and towns in Piedmont